Henry Coston (Paris, 20 December 1910 – Caen, Normandy, 26 July 2001) was a French far-right, anti-Semitic journalist, collaborationist and conspiracy theorist.

Biography 
After joining the Action française, Coston was influenced by journalist Édouard Drumont and took over his newspaper La Libre Parole (an anti-Semitic paper well-known during the Dreyfus affair) in the 1930s. He had previously learned his trade editing La France Ouvrière with Henry Charbonneau. At the same time he created an "Anti-Jewish Youth" organisation "which campaigned for the exclusion of Jews from French life." In the run-up to World War II, he was also in close touch with Ulrich Fleischhauer, German publisher of an internationally distributed anti-Jewish propaganda newsletter, the Welt-Dienst / World-Service / Service Mondial.

During World War II, Coston belonged to Jacques Doriot's fascist PPF. He also was vice-president of the "Association of anti-Jewish Journalists" and he organised the publication of one of the most anti-Semitic document of the Vichy regime, a tract entitled "I hate you" (Je vous hais). At the same period, he also wrote anti-Masonic pamphlets with his colleague Jacques Ploncard d'Assac.

In 1944, he tried to escape in Austria, but he was captured and sentenced to hard labour for life. He was pardoned in 1952 for illness and served only five years. He began writing again, mainly against free-masonry while he kept on denouncing the influence of Jews in French life.

Until the 1990s he was contributing to different far-right newspapers. He was a supporter of the Front National and occasionally wrote in its paper National-Hebdo. From 1967 to 2000, Coston wrote a five-volume Dictionary of French politics (Dictionnaire de la politique française), which is considered as "exactly referenced" and "a non-negligible source of information" by the Jewish historian Simon Epstein.

Notes

References 
 Adrian Dannatt, "Obituary: Henry Coston", in The Independent (London), August 27, 2001 .
 "Notorious French collaborator, Henri Coston, dies at 91", by Agence France-Presse, August 1, 2001.

External links
 

1910 births
2001 deaths
Writers from Paris
French Popular Party politicians
People affiliated with Action Française
Antisemitism in France
Far-right politics in France
French fascists
French collaborators with Nazi Germany
French conspiracy theorists
French anti-communists
French prisoners sentenced to life imprisonment
People convicted of treason against France
Prisoners sentenced to life imprisonment by France
Recipients of French presidential pardons
Order of the Francisque recipients
Anti-Masonry
20th-century French writers
20th-century French male writers
French male non-fiction writers
20th-century French journalists